The Heiress at Coffee Dan's is a 1916 American silent comedy-drama film produced by the Fine Arts Film Company and distributed by Triangle Film Corporation. It starred Bessie Love and was directed by Edward Dillon.

The film is presumed lost.

Plot 

Waffles (Love) is a Swedish immigrant who is working as a waitress in Coffee Dan's, a San Francisco diner. She is in love with poor composer Carl (Bennett).

Thieves Clara Johnstone (Younge) and Bert Gallagher (Paget) learn about a missing heiress in a newspaper, and convince Waffles that she is the heiress. Waffles moves into a lavish mansion, and plans to buys the diner for its chef Shorty (Davidson), publish Carl's music, and adopt a baby. However, Johnstone breaks up Waffles and Carl, and Waffles becomes engaged to Gallagher. Before the wedding, Carl appears and stops it.

When the real heiress appears, Waffles returns to her original life, but she receives a reward for the capture of Johnstone and Gallagher. With her money, she buys the diner for Shorty, publishes Carl's music, and adopts the baby.

Cast

Reception 
Bessie Love received positive reviews for her performance in the title role, called "always pleasing".

The film received mixed reviews. Reviewer George Graves liked the film, but would have preferred it as a straight comedy. He called the direction "adequate". One review called it a "dull story."

References 
Notes

Citations

Works cited

External links 

 
 
 
 The Heiress at "Coffee Dan's" at Silent Era

1916 comedy-drama films
1916 lost films
1916 films
American black-and-white films
1910s English-language films
American silent feature films
Films set in San Francisco
Lost American films
Lost comedy-drama films
1910s American films
Silent American comedy-drama films